The 1999 Toray Pan Pacific Open doubles was the doubles event of the twenty-fourth edition of the Toray Pan Pacific Open Tennis Tournament, the first WTA Tier I tournament of the year. Martina Hingis and Mirjana Lučić were the defending champions but only Hingis competed that year with Jana Novotná.

Hingis and Novotná lost in the final 6–2, 6–3 against Lindsay Davenport and Natasha Zvereva.

Seeds

Draw

Qualifying

Seeds

Qualifiers
  Park Sung-hee /  Wang Shi-ting

Qualifying draw

External links
 1999 Toray Pan Pacific Open Doubles Draw

Pan Pacific Open
Toray Pan Pacific Open - Doubles
1999 Toray Pan Pacific Open